IsoCee is a shopping mall and entertainment center near the Kuopio Market Square in the city center of Kuopio, Finland. The center includes Finnkino's Scala cinema, gym, Restaurant Taikuri and bowling alley Keilakukko. IsoCee was opened on Friday, May 17, 2013, next to the Minna Shopping Center.

In 2014, Carlson Group, which also owned the adjacent Minna Shopping Center,
 sold IsoCee to Keva, a public sector pension financial institution. The purchase price has been reported to be EUR 18.8 million.

References

External links
 IsoCee - Fonecta (in Finnish)
 IsoCee - Aukioloajat (in Finnish)

Buildings and structures in Kuopio
Shopping centres in Finland
Shopping malls established in 2013